Tese (Teisei) is an Eastern Sudanic language spoken in the Nuba Hills of Sudan.

Ethnologue lists Keiga Jirru as an alternate name.

References

Temein languages (Roger Blench 2007)

External links
 Tese basic lexicon at the Global Lexicostatistical Database

Critically endangered languages
Temein languages